Doctor at the Top is a British television comedy series based on a set of books by Richard Gordon about the misadventures of a group of doctors. With episodes written (though not jointly) by George Layton and Bill Oddie, the series follows directly from its predecessor Doctor Down Under, eleven years earlier. It was produced by the BBC and broadcast on BBC1 in 1991.

In this series the lead characters have all progressed in their careers: Waring and Collier are now surgeons, and Stuart-Clark is a professor.

The series was not as well received as its predecessors and was cancelled after one series. According to Layton, it "depressed the whole nation", and Oddie dubbed it "Doctor Down The Drain".

Cast
 Robin Nedwell - Mr Duncan Waring
 George Layton - Mr Paul Collier
 Geoffrey Davies - Professor Dick Stuart-Clark
 Ernest Clark - Sir Geoffrey Loftus
 Roger Sloman - Dr Lionel Snell
 Georgina Melville - Geraldine Waring
 Chloë Annett - Rebecca Stuart-Clark
 Jill Benedict - Emma Stuart-Clark
Andrew Powell - Crabtree
Ben Onwukwe - Jonathan Asante
Laura Bickford - Pushpinda
Maria Collett - Margaret 
Paul Courtenay Hyu - Lee
John Clegg - Dinner Guest 
Linda James - Angela
Angus Deayton - Adrian Quint
Jayne Irving - TV Presenter

Episodes
 "Sins of the Father"
 "Happy Birthday, Sir Geoffrey"
 "The V.I.P."
 "The Kindest Cut"
 "Bye Bye, Bickerstaff"
 "It's All Right, I'm a Doctor"
 "Waring Goes Private?"

References

External links
Doctor at the Top at British TV Comedy Guide

1991 British television series debuts
1991 British television series endings
1990s British medical television series
1990s British sitcoms
BBC television sitcoms
Doctor in the House
English-language television shows
Television shows set in London